Robert Sharoff is a Chicago-based architectural writer and author. He has written for a variety of publications including the New York Times, the Washington Post, the Chicago Tribune, and Chicago Magazine. He frequently collaborates with photographer William Zbaren.

Bibliography 
American City: Detroit Architecture 1845-2005 (photographs by William Zbaren)
Lucien Lagrange: The Search for Elegance (photographs by William Zbaren)
American City: St. Louis Architecture, Three Centuries of Classic Design (photographs by William Zbaren)
Last Is More: Mies, IBM, and the Transformation of Chicago (photographs by William Zbaren)
John Vinci: Life and Landmarks (photographs by William Zbaren)

See also
Architecture of metropolitan Detroit

Further reading

External links
Publisher's review of Sharoff's 2005 work
The American City
Metro Times review of Sharoff's 2005 work
Chicago Tribune review of John Vinci: Life and Landmarks

American architecture writers
American male non-fiction writers
Living people
Year of birth missing (living people)